Maciej Cieplucha (born 3 August 1988) is a Polish former competitive figure skater. He is the 2011 Finlandia Trophy bronze medalist, a two-time Warsaw Cup bronze medalist, and a three-time Polish national champion (2010, 2012, 2014). He has qualified three times for the free skate at the European Championships—in 2012, 2013, and 2014.

Career 
Cieplucha began competing on the ISU Junior Grand Prix series in 2003. He won the Polish national junior title in the 2004–05 season. In 2006–07, Cieplucha made his international senior debut at the 2006 Karl Schäfer Memorial and also appeared as a senior at the Polish Championships, but competed mostly on the junior level internationally until the end of the 2007–08 season. He competed twice at the World Junior Championships, finishing 20th in 2007 and 24th in 2008.

In the 2009–10 season, Cieplucha won the Polish national senior title for the first time and was given his European Championship debut. He missed qualifying for the free skate by one spot. He was also assigned to his first senior World Championships and finished 35th.

Cieplucha trained in Łódź, Poland with coaches Włodzimierz Brajczewski and Mirosława Brajczewska until July 2010 when he moved to Calgary, Alberta to be coached by Scott Davis and Jeff Langdon. In Canada, he trained at the Calalta Figure Skating Club.

Cieplucha qualified for the free skate at the 2012 European Championships and again at the 2013 European Championships but was one spot away from reaching the free skate at both the 2013 World Championships and 2014 World Championships.

In the 2013–14 season, Cieplucha placed 11th at the 2013 Nebelhorn Trophy, an Olympic qualifier, and became the first alternate for the men's event at the 2014 Winter Olympics. At the 2014 European Championships in Budapest, he achieved a personal best short program score, 65.84 points, and qualified for the free skate.

Programs

Competitive highlights 
JGP: Junior Grand Prix

References

External links

 
 Maciej Cieplucha at Tracings

Polish male single skaters
Living people
1988 births
Sportspeople from Łódź